Roger Byron Wilson (born October 10, 1948) is an American politician who briefly served as the 52nd Governor of Missouri from October 16, 2000 to January 8, 2001. Wilson was serving his second four-year term as lieutenant governor and was preparing to retire from elected public service when Governor Mel Carnahan died in a plane crash on October 16, 2000. Wilson first became acting governor and was sworn in as governor when Carnahan’s death was confirmed.

After leaving the governor’s office, Wilson was elected by fellow Democrats to serve as Missouri Democratic Party chair.

Early life and education 
Wilson was born in Boone County, Missouri. He attended college at Central Methodist College and graduated class of 1977. He was a school teacher and an elementary school principal in Columbia, Missouri.

Political career 
Wilson began his political career as a Boone County Collector in 1976. He was elected to the Missouri State Senate from the 19th District in a 1979 special election and was re-elected by large majorities in 1980, 1984, and 1988 He served as Lieutenant Governor of Missouri from 1993 to 2000. As lieutenant governor to Mel Carnahan, Roger Wilson was dedicated to advocating for the "Four E's": economic development, education, efficiency in government, and the elderly.

Governor of Missouri 
In October 2000, Governor Mel Carnahan died in an airplane crash, and Wilson served as governor until the end of the term in 2001. Following Governor Carnahan's posthumous election to the U.S. Senate, Wilson appointed his widow Jean Carnahan to serve in his place.

Chairman of the Missouri Democratic Party 
In August 2004, Wilson became Chairman of the Missouri Democratic Party and endorsed Claire McCaskill (D) in her bid to unseat incumbent Governor Bob Holden (D) in the Democratic Primary. McCaskill won the primary, but lost the general election to Republican Matt Blunt. In January 2007, Wilson announced he would not seek an additional term as Democratic Chairman.

Subsequent career  
On April 12, 2012, Wilson pleaded guilty to federal charges of money laundering. Wilson had improperly donated money to the Missouri Democratic Party and billed the public entity Missouri Employers Mutual for legal fees to cover it up. Wilson pled guilty and was fined $2,000 by the Missouri Ethics Commission. In July he was sentenced to two years of probation on the money laundering charge.

Wilson was also ousted as President and CEO of Missouri Employers Mutual in Columbia, Missouri in June 2011.

References

External links
 
 National Governors Association

|-

1948 births
Living people
American money launderers
Democratic Party governors of Missouri
Politicians from Columbia, Missouri
Democratic Party Missouri state senators
Lieutenant Governors of Missouri
University of Missouri alumni
Central Methodist University alumni
State political party chairs of Missouri
Missouri politicians convicted of crimes